Franz Ritter von Neumann the Younger (January 16, 1844, Vienna – February 1, 1905, Vienna) was an Austrian architect.

Biography
Neumann came from a family of notable architects: his father Franz Neumann (1815–1888) and his brother Gustav von Neumann (1856–1928) were both well known in Vienna.  He began his career as an apprentice to Eduard van der Nüll and August Sicard von Sicardsburg, then joined the staff of Friedrich von Schmidt.

Neumann's major work includes (in Vienna unless otherwise noted):

 Kuffner Observatory, 1886
 Liebenberg Memorial, 1887 
 Habsburgwarte, 1889
 Liberec Town Hall, Liberec (Reichenberg), 1893
 Frýdlant Town Hall, 1893
 St. Leopold's Church, Donaufeld, 1914

References

External links 

1844 births
1905 deaths
Architects from Vienna
Austrian knights
Burials at the Vienna Central Cemetery